Maya is an Indian actress who has appeared in the Tamil film industry. After making her film debut with AR Murugadoss's production Maan Karate (2014) in a supporting role and she has since moved on to play leading roles.

Career
Preethi Shankar attended SRM Dental College and became qualified as a dentist before venturing into films. She made her acting debut by playing a supporting role in Maan Karate (2014) as one of the five software professionals who befriend Sivakarthikeyan's character. Preethi then adopted the stage name of Maya when starring in her first leading role, through the horror film Darling 2. Portraying a Muslim girl seeking revenge, the film garnered mixed reviews upon release. Maya then went on to work in the romantic comedy film, Unnodu Ka opposite Aari, after the director was impressed with her stills from Darling 2.

Filmography

References

External links
 

Living people
Actresses in Tamil cinema
Actresses from Tamil Nadu
Indian film actresses
21st-century Indian actresses
1989 births